The second attack on ANZAC Cove (27 April 1915) was an engagement during the Gallipoli Campaign of the First World War. The attack was conducted by the forces of the Ottoman Turkish Empire, against the forces of the British Empire defending the cove.

References
Footnotes

Citations

Bibliography

Conflicts in 1915
1915 in the Ottoman Empire
New Zealand Mounted Rifles Brigade
Battles of World War I involving Australia
Battles of World War I involving New Zealand
Battles of World War I involving the United Kingdom
Battles of World War I involving British India
Battles of World War I involving the Ottoman Empire
Battles of the Gallipoli campaign
April 1915 events